Roethlisberger is a surname. Notable people with the name include:

Ben Roethlisberger (born 1982), American football player
Fritz Roethlisberger (1898–1974), American social scientist
John Roethlisberger (born 1970), American gymnast
Marcel Roethlisberger (born 1929), Swiss art historian 
Marie Roethlisberger (born 1966), American gymnast
Rudy W. Roethlisberger (1894–1957), American politician

See also
Röthlisberger, surname